Otto George Moore (born August 27, 1946) is a retired American professional basketball player.

A 6'11" center from the University of Texas-Pan American, Moore played nine seasons (1968–1977) in the National Basketball Association as a member of the Detroit Pistons, Phoenix Suns, Houston Rockets, Kansas City–Omaha Kings, and New Orleans Jazz. He averaged a double-double twice in his career, once with the Pistons (11.9 points and 11.1 rebounds per game in 1969–70), and once for the Rockets (11.7 points and 10.6 rebounds per game in 1972–73).  Across his entire career, he averaged 8.2 points and 8.2 rebounds per game.  He also ranked eighth in the league in blocks per game (1.7) during the 1975–76 NBA season with the Jazz.

Moore owns the distinction of having appeared in the second-most regular season NBA games (682) without having appeared in a playoff game, behind Tom Van Arsdale.

Philippine Stint
In 1979, the Royal Tru Orange inked Moore for a one-conference stint with them. Joining the high-volume scorer, American Larry Pounds, the tandem proved to be a lethal threat. He and Pounds led the Royal Tru-Orange to a championship in the 1979 Open Conference.

Notes

1946 births
Living people
African-American basketball players
American expatriate basketball people in Italy
American expatriate basketball people in the Philippines
American men's basketball players
Basketball players from Miami
Centers (basketball)
Detroit Pistons draft picks
Detroit Pistons players
Houston Rockets players
Kansas City Kings players
Maine Lumberjacks players
New Orleans Jazz players
Pallacanestro Virtus Roma players
Philippine Basketball Association imports
Phoenix Suns players
Power forwards (basketball)
San Miguel Beermen players
Texas–Pan American Broncs men's basketball players
21st-century African-American people
20th-century African-American sportspeople